Stillman Valley is a village in Marion Township, Ogle County, Illinois, United States. It lies east of Byron, south of Rockford and west of Davis Junction. The population was 1,120 at the 2010 census, up from 1,048 in 2000. The village is located on the Iowa, Chicago and Eastern Railroad, on the old Chicago Great Western Railway before it merged and was pulled up. Also, Illinois Route 72 runs through the village. It is near the site of the first battle of the Black Hawk War of 1832. The war memorial for the Battle of Stillman's Run is located in this village.

Geography

History 

Stillman Valley was founded by European-American settlers in north central Illinois in 1876. A creek running through the community was named after Major Stillman of the Illinois Militia who on May 14, 1832 led troops in what became the first named battle of the Black Hawk War. The battle and the creek were called "Stillman's Run" after Stillman and his men fled the battlefield in the belief that they had been attacked by a superior force of Chief Black Hawk's warriors. The day after the battle, Abraham Lincoln was with the militia who buried the dead soldiers from the battle. The village was named after Stillman Creek; the valley serves as the watershed for the creek, hence the name Stillman Valley.

The Stillman's Run Battle Site and burial ground are in present-day Stillman Valley. A large memorial to this battle was erected in 1901. It reads, in part: "Here, on May 14, 1832, the first engagement of the Black Hawk War took place. When 275 Illinois militiamen under Maj. Isaiah Stillman were put to flight by Black Hawk and his warriors."

Demographics

As of the census of 2000, there were 1,048 people, 395 households, and 295 families residing in the village. The population density was 735.7 /sq mi (284.1 /km). The racial makeup of the village was 97.23% White, 0.29% African American, 0.67% Native American, 0.38% Asian, 0.48% from other races, and 0.95% from two or more races. Hispanic or Latino of any race were 1.43% of the population.

There were 395 households, out of which 39.2% had children under the age of 18 living with them, 61.5% were married couples living together, 10.9% had a female householder with no husband present, and 25.3% were non-families. 23.3% of all households were made up of individuals, and 10.1% had someone living alone who was 65 years of age or older. The average household size was 2.65 and the average family size was 3.14.

In the village, the population was spread out, with 30.5% under the age of 18, 6.5% from 18 to 24, 31.3% from 25 to 44, 20.1% from 45 to 64, and 11.5% who were 65 years of age or older. The median age was 35 years. For every 100 females, there were 90.2 males. For every 100 females age 18 and over, there were 90.6 males.

The median income for a household in the village was $46,845, and the median income for a family was $54,792. Males had a median income of $36,635 versus $28,250 for females. The per capita income for the village was $21,036. About 4.6% of families and 4.6% of the population were below the poverty line, including 4.5% of those under age 18 and 5.7% of those age 65 or over. They are state champions in high school football 1999, 2000, 2003, 2009, and 2013.

Political representation
  Stillman Valley has a Board of Trustees who serve alternating four-year terms. The Village President (by statute this is synonymous with the term "Mayor") serves a four-year term as well.  The Village President (as of May 2013) is the Honorable Becky Waltrip; her first term ends in 2017. Becky Waltrip is the first woman elected as Village President. Ogle County Election Results
 16th Congressional District represented by Adam Kinzinger.  Adam Kinzinger Official Website
 Illinois Senate District 45 represented by Tim Bivins.
 Illinois Representative District 90 represented by Tom Demmer.
 Illinois Election Information

Previous village presidents
 Jim Mays served from 2005 - 2013 (2 terms) 
 James Leather served from 1984 - 2004 (20 years service)
 Stillman Valley elected Mike Blomgren, an 18-year-old high school senior, as its mayor in 1976.

Schools

The schools are Highland Grade School, Monroe Center School, Meridian Junior High School and Stillman Valley High School. The high school is well known in Illinois for excellent academic and sports programs. A November 28, 2009 headline from the Rockford Register Star proclaims it, "Valley of The Champions" in reference to the boys football program with state championships in 1999, 2000, 2003, 2009, and 2013.

Notable people 

 John A. Atwood, businessman and Illinois state legislator
 George Bird, center fielder with the Rockford Forest Citys
 Dan Godfread, center with the Minnesota Timberwolves and Houston Rockets
 Frank White, the eighth Governor of North Dakota
 Joshua White, businessman and Illinois state legislator

References

External links

Stillman Valley official website
Battle of Stillman's Run
Abraham Lincoln Online

 
Villages in Ogle County, Illinois
Villages in Illinois
Populated places established in 1875
1875 establishments in Illinois
1876 establishments in Illinois